Kahruyeh Rural District is a rural district (dehestan) in the Central District of Shahreza County, Isfahan Province, Iran. At the 2006 census, its population was 2,530, in 700 families.  The rural district has 5 villages.

References 

Rural Districts of Isfahan Province
Shahreza County